Eri Irianto (12 January 1974 – 3 April 2000) was a player of Persebaya Surabaya.

He died on 3 April 2000 after collapsing following a heart attack on the pitch during a league match against PSIM Yogyakarta at Gelora 10 November Stadium. The mess was renamed from Persebaya and is now "Wisma Eri Irianto".  He wore number 19 which was retired after his death.

International career

International goals

Honours

Club
Persebaya Surabaya
 Liga Indonesia runner-up: 1998–99

International
Indonesia
 AFF Championship fourth place: 1996

References

Indonesian footballers
Indonesian expatriate footballers
2000 deaths
Association football players who died while playing
1974 births
Persebaya Surabaya players
Kuala Lumpur City F.C. players
Association football midfielders
Indonesia international footballers
Sport deaths in Indonesia
Expatriate footballers in Malaysia
Indonesian expatriate sportspeople in Malaysia
People from Sidoarjo Regency
Sportspeople from East Java